is a future subway station on the Fukuoka City Subway Nanakuma Line in Hakata-ku, Fukuoka in Japan.

Lines

Platforms

History 
The name of the station was finalized on 1 July 2021.

Kushida Shrine Station is scheduled to begin operations on 27 March 2023 when the Nanakuma Line is extended east to Hakata Station. Originally scheduled for a 2020 opening, a sinkhole pushed back the opening date by three years.

Surrounding area 

 Kushida Shrine

References

External links 

 Official construction website (in Japanese)

Railway stations in Fukuoka Prefecture
Railway stations scheduled to open in 2023
Nanakuma Line

Proposed railway stations in Japan